Kim Ja-in (Hangul: , born 11 September 1988), more widely known in the West as Jain Kim, is a professional climber. She is mainly active in lead climbing and bouldering competitions. She has won the Lead Climbing World Cup three times (2010, 2013, 2014), the Lead Climbing World Championship once (2014), and the Rock Master once (2010, Lead discipline). Moreover, she has won the Asian Championships 14 times in 15 years, namely 11 times in lead climbing and 3 times in bouldering (see below for details).

Jain Kim also successfully climbs outdoors. In 2014, she redpointed her first routes graded beyond 8b+; namely Bibita Biologica (8c) and Reini's Vibes (8c/8c+), both in Arco, Italy.

Biography 

Born into a family of mountain-dwellers and climbers, Jain Kim started climbing at the age of 12. In July 2004, at the age of 15, she started competing in the Lead Climbing World Cup and since 2006 she has also participated in the Bouldering World Cup.

She won the Lead Climbing Asian Championship in 2004, 2005, 2006, 2008, 2009, and 2010. In 2008, she also won the Bouldering Asian Championship. In 2009, she ranked second in the Lead Climbing World Cup, second in the Lead Climbing World Championship, second in the World Games (Lead), and third in the Rock Master (Lead).

In 2010, she won the lead climbing competitions both in the Rock Master and the World Cup. She obtained the World Cup overall title by ranking first in five of the six stages, namely those held in Xining, Chuncheon, Puurs, Huaiji, and Kranj. The only World Cup stage that Jain Kim did not win in 2010 was the first one, held in Chamonix. She won the Lead Climbing World Cup again in 2013 and 2014, each time winning four of the eight events.

In May and June 2014, she redpointed her first routes in rock climbing graded 8b+, namely Bibita Biologica (8c) and Reini's Vibes (8c/8c+), both in Arco, Italy.

On September 14, 2014, three days after she had turned 26, she achieved an extraordinary victory at the Lead Climbing World Championships, where she managed to ascend (on-sight) all of the routes attempted in the qualifications, the semifinals, and the finals.

On May 20, 2017, she climbed the 555-meter Lotte World Tower in Seoul.

Personal life 
She is married to Oh Young-hwan, member of 21st National Assembly of Korea, who was a firefighter of Seoul Fire Services and writer. On March 10, 2021, Kim gave birth to a daughter.

Rankings

Climbing World Cup

Climbing World Championships 
Youth

Adult

World Games

Rock Master

Asian Championships

World Cup podiums

Lead

Bouldering

Television

See also 
List of grade milestones in rock climbing
History of rock climbing
Rankings of most career IFSC gold medals

References

External links 

 
 

 

1988 births
Living people
Female climbers
South Korean rock climbers
Korea University alumni
World Games silver medalists
Competitors at the 2005 World Games
Competitors at the 2009 World Games
Competitors at the 2013 World Games
Asian Games medalists in sport climbing
Sport climbers at the 2018 Asian Games
Asian Games bronze medalists for South Korea
Medalists at the 2018 Asian Games
People from Goyang
Sportspeople from Gyeonggi Province
IFSC Climbing World Championships medalists
IFSC Climbing World Cup overall medalists